Dakaram is a small village in the state of Andhra Pradesh, India, near Mudinepalli, Gudivada.

The population of Dakaram is approximately 1500. The villagers are mostly involved in agricultural-based professions.

The village consists of a primary school, sri Seetha Rama swamy temple and Sri Dasanjaneya swamy temple.

Villages in Krishna district